John William Bormann (born April 4, 1993) is an American former professional baseball catcher. He played in Major League Baseball in 2017 for the Pittsburgh Pirates.

Amateur career
Bormann attended Navarro High School in Geronimo, Texas. At Navarro, he played as a pitcher and shortstop for the baseball team, and quarterback and safety for the football team. The Seguin Gazette named him their All-Area Player of the Year in football in 2010.

He enrolled at the University of Texas at San Antonio (UTSA), where he played college baseball for the UTSA Roadrunners as a catcher. In 2014, he played collegiate summer baseball with the Wareham Gatemen of the Cape Cod Baseball League. The Los Angeles Angels of Anaheim selected him in the 19th round of the 2014 MLB draft, but he did not sign, returning to UTSA for his senior year later graduating with a degree in Real Estate Finance and Development.

Professional career
The Pirates selected him in the 24th round of the 2015 MLB draft. He played in seven games for the Bradenton Marauders of the Class A-Advanced Florida State League in 2017, before the Pirates promoted him to the major leagues on April 30, 2017. He made his major league debut that day. He received one at bat for the Pirates before they sent him outright to Bradenton. In his minor league career through 2017 he batted .226/.286/.296 with two home runs and no stolen bases in 399 at bats.

He was assigned to Single-A Advanced Bradenton to start the 2019 season.

He announced his retirement on August 11, 2019.

References

External links

1993 births
Living people
Sportspeople from Danville, Virginia
Major League Baseball catchers
Pittsburgh Pirates players
UTSA Roadrunners baseball players
Wareham Gatemen players
Bristol Pirates players
West Virginia Power players
Bradenton Marauders players
Indianapolis Indians players
Baseball players from Virginia
Altoona Curve players